Caroline Walker may refer to:
 Caroline Walker (athlete) (born 1953), American long-distance runner
 Caroline Walker (food campaigner) (1950–1988), British nutritionist, writer, author and campaigner
 Caroline Walker (artist) (born 1982), Scottish artist
 Caroline Holme Walker (1863–1955), American composer, pianist, and teacher

See also
 Carolyn Walker-Diallo, American judge